Yolŋu (Yolngu) or Murngin Sign Language is a ritual sign language used by the Yolngu, an Aboriginal community in the Arnhem Land region of Australia. As with other Australian Aboriginal sign languages, YSL was developed by the hearing for use when oral speech is forbidden, as during mourning or between certain family relations. (See speech taboo.) However, "YSL is not a signed version of any spoken Yolngu language... YSL also serves as a primary means of communication for a number of deaf members in Yolngu communities... YSL functions as both an alternate and primary sign language". That is, it is used for communicating to the deaf, but also when communicating at a distance, when hunting, or when ceremonies require silence.  It was acquired from birth by the hearing population.  YSL is now considered an endangered language.

See also
Warlpiri Sign Language

Citations

References
 Yolngu Sign Language project at the University of Central Lancashire 
 Kendon, Adam (1988) Sign Languages of Aboriginal Australia: cultural, semiotic, and communicative perspective. Cambridge University Press.
 Warner, W. Lloyd (1937) "Murngin Sign Language", A Black Civilization. New York: Harper and Row, pp. 389–392.
 Bauer, Anastasia (2014) "The use of signing space in a shared sign language of Australia", Sign Language Typology 5, De Gruyter Mouton & Ishara Press. Berlin & Nijmegen.

External links
ISO request to recognize Yan-nhaŋu Sign Language as a distinct language

Australian Aboriginal Sign Language family
Yolŋu languages
Sign languages

lv:Varlpiri žestu valoda